Smoky Hill High School is located in Aurora, Colorado, United States. It enrolls around 2,600 students. Smoky Hill is part of the Cherry Creek School District and was the second high school built by the district in 1974.

It goes by the short name 'Smoky'. The name comes from the fact that the school is located not far from the Smoky Hill Trail, an old pioneer trail stretching from Kansas to Denver.

Curriculum
In 1991, Smoky Hill became the second high school in Colorado to offer the International Baccalaureate Program. Since that time Smoky has been recognized in Newsweeks nationwide list of excellent high schools. In 2006, Smoky Hill's AVID program was the only school in the AVID Western Division to be recognized as a National Demonstration School with Distinction. Smoky Hill also supports the Advanced Placement program and offers nineteen AP classes.

Renovations
In the summer of 2010, the Cherry Creek School District began renovations to improve the overall functionality of the building.  The windows were enlarged, the pool area was completely reconstructed, new carpet was installed, and the general aesthetics of the school were modernized to comply with more current styles in design. All renovations were completed before the 2010–2011 year, except for the pool area, which was completed during the first quarter of the school year.

Athletics
Smoky Hill High School is part of the eight-team Centennial League that also includes Cherry Creek, Grandview, Arapahoe, Cherokee Trail, Eaglecrest, Mullen, and Overland high schools.

Track and field
In 1992, Smoky Hill won its first state championship in track. Their first State Championship was in football in the 1970's.  They also had a three-time state championship run during 2003–2005.

International Baccalaureate (IB) 

In 1991, Smoky Hill became the second International Baccalaureate Diploma School established in the state of Colorado.

The International Baccalaureate (IB) Diploma Programme (DP) is an educational programme examined in one of three languages (English, French or Spanish) and is a leading university entrance course.

The programme, administered by the International Baccalaureate Organization, is a recognized pre-university educational programme. Students take six subjects, and must also pass three extra requirements, for example Theory of Knowledge (ToK), a 4000-word Extended Essay (EE), and a requirement of at least a total of 150 hours in CAS (Creative, Action, Service).

Smoky Hill boasts its ability to offer one of the newer tests in the International Baccalaureate Programme, Digital Media Studies.  2009 was the first year that students tested in both the Higher Level and Standard Level of the test.

Notable alumni

 Mike McDaniel, NFL head coach for the Miami Dolphins (class of 2001)
 Alison Dunlap, Olympic mountain biker
 Bowen Yang, comedian and cast member of Saturday Night Live (class of 2008)
 Chase Vaughn, football linebacker
 Lesley Chilcott, documentarian
 Kelly Hansen, lead singer in Foreigner (class of 1979)
 Maggie Flecknoe, voice actress and news reporter (class of 2001)
 Dan Soder, stand-up comedian (class of 2001)
 Jenny Cavnar, host of pre and post game shows for AT&T SportsNet Rocky Mountain
 Fear Before, rock band
 Cory Sandhagen, mixed martial artist

See also
 List of high schools in Colorado

References

External links
 Smoky Hill High School official web site

Public high schools in Colorado
Educational institutions established in 1974
Education in Aurora, Colorado
Cherry Creek School District
International Baccalaureate schools in Colorado
Schools in Arapahoe County, Colorado
1974 establishments in Colorado